Qishr ( geshir, gishr, kishr) is an Southeastern Arabic traditional hot drink made of spiced coffee husks, ginger, and sometimes cinnamon. In Yemen, it is usually drunk as an alternative to coffee because it doesn't need to be roasted.

History

Coffee arrived in Yemen from across the Red Sea into the Arabian Peninsula into the region that is now Yemen, where Muslim dervishes began cultivating the shrub in their gardens. At first, Yemenis made wine from the pulp of the fermented coffee berries. This beverage was known as qishr and was used during religious ceremonies.

"Ginger coffee is the universal drink and the cup is always filled, a guest being given two cups at once... Qishr, an infusion made from the husks of coffee berries, is also drunk, particularly in the Tihamat al 'Asir."

Concerning qishr, "Great hospitality was shown to us on entering their houses; we were always pressed to stay, and never allowed to go without taking a cup of coffee or rather an infusion of coffee husk called 'keshr'; for, strange to say, though in the heart of the coffee country, coffee is never taken as a beverage."

See also
 Coffea arabica
 Coffee cherry tea

References

Bibliography
 Philby, H. St. J. B. (Harry St. John Bridger), 1885–1960. Arabian Highlands. Ithaca: Published for the Middle East Institute, Washington, D.C. [by] Cornell University Press, [1952]. Subjects: Arabian Peninsula—Description and travel. 771 p. : illus., maps (part fold., 1 in pocket). OCLC No.: 01083943. Page 687.
 

Arabic drinks
Yemeni cuisine
Coffee derivatives
Herbal tea
Entheogens
Ceremonial food and drink
Guest greeting food and drink